= Patricia Frazier =

American psychology professor

- Born: Patricia A Frazier; United States
- Education: University of Minnesota
- Known for: Research on coping with stressful or traumatic life events, developing innovative interventions for traumatic life events
- Awards: Early Career Scientist-Practitioner Award, Division17, American Psychological Association(1996), McKnight Distinguished University Professorship (2010), McKnight Land Grant Professorship (1992 - 1994), Exemplary paper award, John Templeton Foundation (1998), Fellow, Division 17 (Counseling Psychology), American Psychological Association (1997), Charlotte Striebel Equity Award (2015), Fellow, Division 9 (Society for the Psychological Study of Social Issues), American Psychological Association (2007)
- Scientific career
- Fields: Psychology
- Workplaces: University of Minnesota

Patricia A. Frazier is an American psychology professor who researches the application of social psychological theory and research to problems of concern to counseling psychologists. In particular, coping with stressful or traumatic life events, and developing innovative interventions. She heads the Stress and Trauma Lab at the University of Minnesota. Her recent research is focused on the effects of stress and trauma, as well as daily-diary methods for understanding coping strategies.

== Educational Background ==
Ph.D.: University of Minnesota, 1988.

== Research in Online Stress Management ==
Released in 2015 Patricia A. Frazier would release a paper along with Samuel Hintz and Liza Meredith titled Evaluating an online stress management intervention for college students. The paper would find that students exposed to informative online modules that taught students how to identify and manage control of stressors would report much lower levels of perceived stress.

== Specialties ==
|coping strategies |postrape recovery |reactions to victimization, trauma |online interventions |stress |victims and violence |College Student Mental Health
